The National Rally for Democracy was a political party in Mali led by Abdoulaye Garba Tapo.

History
The party was established on 25 July 1997, and won a single seat in the parliamentary elections that year. For the 2002 elections it was part of the Convergence for Alternance and Change alliance, which won ten seats.

The 2007 elections saw the party join the Alliance for Democracy and Progress, winning a single seat as the Alliance won a large majority in the National Assembly.

On 29 April 2008 it merged into the Alliance for Democracy in Mali.

References

Defunct political parties in Mali
Political parties established in 1997
Political parties disestablished in 2008